Hải Phòng station is one of the main railway stations on the Hanoi–Hai Phong railway in Vietnam. It serves the city of Hai Phong and opened in 1902. It is a terminus of the Sino-Vietnamese Railway, a French engineered narrow gauge railway completed in 1910, which was the first railway line to the Chinese city of Kunming.

References

Buildings and structures in Haiphong
Railway stations in Vietnam
French colonial architecture in Vietnam